Ernest Aubrey Bacon   (5 June 1893 – 18 April 1966) was a British wrestler. He competed in the freestyle lightweight event at the 1924 Summer Olympics. 

Bacon was a Civil Servant. He was Head of Section in the Ministry of Works and was awarded an MBE in the 1947 Birthday Honours.

His older brothers Stanley and Edgar were also Olympic wrestlers.

References

External links
 

1893 births
1966 deaths
Olympic wrestlers of Great Britain
Wrestlers at the 1924 Summer Olympics
British male sport wrestlers
People from Camberwell
Sportspeople from London
Members of the Order of the British Empire